The Amazing Race Canada 4 is the fourth season of The Amazing Race Canada, a reality game show based on the American series The Amazing Race. It features ten teams of two, each with a pre-existing relationship in a race across Canada and across the world and is hosted by Jon Montgomery. The grand prize includes a  cash payout, a "once-in-a-lifetime" trip for two around the world with hotel accommodations provided by Hotels.com, and the choice of any two Chevrolet vehicles driven during the season.

The season premiere aired on June 28, 2016, with the finale airing on September 13, 2016.

Dating couple Stephanie "Steph" LeClair and Kristen McKenzie were the winners of this season. They are the first all-female team to win the Canadian edition of the show and the first lesbian couple team to win any edition of The Amazing Race worldwide. In the After the Race reunion special, it was revealed that both chose the Silverado truck featured in Leg 1.

Production

Development and filming

On September 21, 2015, CTV announced that the show was renewed for a fourth season.

Filming of the show was reported in Yellowknife, in the Northwest Territories, at the Legislative Assembly building, on Frame Lake close to the Prince of Wales Northern Heritage Centre, and at the ceremonial circle near the Royal Canadian Mounted Police "G" Division headquarters downtown. On May 10, host Jon Montgomery was spotted near a clue box at Prince Rupert City Hall, in British Columbia. Teams were reported racing near Kingston Penitentiary, in Kingston, Ontario on May 14, where a U-Turn board was also seen.

This season visited Vietnam for two legs. However, unlike previous broadcasts in the franchise where the red and yellow Amazing Race flags were replaced during Vietnam legs due to confusion with the former flag of South Vietnam, this season continued to use the normal red and yellow flags.

This season featured the Nova Scotia underground coal miner's choir The Men of the Deeps, who were the local greeters at the Pit Stop of Leg 9 in their home region of Cape Breton Island.

Casting
Casting began on September 23, 2015, and as in the previous three seasons, an online site was used for submission of applications and audition videos. Casting closed on November 23, 2015.

Programming
A half-hour special episode titled The Amazing Race Canada: Top 20 Moments, reviewing the events of the first seven episodes, aired in place of a regular episode on August 16, with regular episodes resuming the following week. Similar to previous seasons, a special season-end reunion/recap again titled After The Race, this time hosted by the cast of The Social, aired immediately after the season finale with 19 contestants present (minus Kate who was unable to attend) to review the season as a whole.

Marketing
Petro-Canada and trip sponsor Air Canada discontinued their sponsorship, Chevrolet continued sponsoring the show along with previous seasons' sponsors Bank of Montreal (BMO) and Mentos. New sponsors for this season were outerwear sponsor Mountain Equipment Co-op and trip sponsor Hotels.com.

Cast
The cast includes actress and Mrs. Universe 2015 winner (and first Indigenous woman to do so) Ashley Callingbull-Burnham, and Big Brother Canada 1 houseguests Jillian MacLaughlin and Emmett Blois, who won and placed 3rd, respectively. Lowell Taylor is the first legally blind contestant in any edition of The Amazing Race.

Future appearances
Jillian MacLaughlin appeared on the penultimate episode of Big Brother Canada 6.

Results
The following teams participated in this season, each listed along with their placements in each leg and relationships as identified by the program. Note that this table is not necessarily reflective of all content broadcast on television, owing to the inclusion or exclusion of some data. Placements are listed in finishing order.

A  placement with a dagger indicates that the team was eliminated.
An  placement with a double-dagger indicates that the team was the last to arrive at a pit stop in a non-elimination leg, and had to perform a Speed Bump task in the following leg.
 An italicized and underlined placement indicates that the team was the last to arrive at a pit stop, but there was no rest period at the pit stop and all teams were instructed to continue racing. There was no required Speed Bump task in the next leg.
An  indicates that the team used an Express Pass on that leg to bypass one of their tasks.
A  indicates that the team used the U-Turn and a  indicates the team on the receiving end of the U-Turn.
A  indicates the leg has the Face Off, while a  indicates the team that lost the Face Off.

Notes

Prizes
The prize for each leg is awarded to the first place team for that leg. Trips are provided by Hotels.com.

Leg 1 – A trip for two to London, England
Leg 2 – A trip for two to Paris, France
Leg 3 – A trip for two to Tokyo, Japan
Leg 4 – A trip for two to Los Angeles, California
Leg 5 – A trip for two to New York City, New York
Leg 6 – A trip for two to Delhi, India
Leg 7 – A trip for two to Rome, Italy
Leg 8 – A trip for two to Cancún, Mexico
Leg 9 – A trip for two to Mexico City, Mexico
Teen Driver System Driving Report Challenge – $5,000 from Chevrolet. Awarded to Jillian & Emmett and Frankie & Amy after a tied result.
Leg 10 – A trip for two to Sydney, Australia
Leg 11 – , a "once-in-a-lifetime" trip for two around the world with hotel accommodations provided by new sponsor Hotels.com, and the winning team's choice of any Chevrolet vehicle driven during the season (In the After the Race reunion special, it was revealed that both chose the Silverado truck featured in Leg 1.)

Race summary

Leg 1 (Northwest Territories → Alberta)

Airdate: June 28, 2016
Yellowknife, Northwest Territories, Canada (Frame Lake) (Starting Line)
Yellowknife (Prince of Wales Northern Heritage Centre – Ceremonial Circle)
Yellowknife (Northwest Territories Legislative Assembly)
 Yellowknife (Yellowknife Airport) to Edmonton, Alberta (Edmonton International Airport)
 Leduc County (Edmonton International Airport) to Jasper (Jasper Train Station)
  Jasper (Jasper Skytram)
 Jasper National Park (Athabasca River)
 Jasper National Park (Two Valley Creek Canyon)
Jasper National Park (Pyramid Lake – Pyramid Island) 

In this season's first Roadblock, one team member would be equipped with a bungee cord and ride in the Jasper Skytram, which would stop in midair halfway up the mountain. At this point, they climbed out of the tram and used monkey bars underneath to reach their clue on the other side. Only three teams were permitted in the Skytram at a time. If they fell, they would have to wait in line for the next crossing (about one hour).

In this leg's second Roadblock, teams had to drive themselves to Two Valley Creek Canyon. Here, the team member who did not perform the previous Roadblock had to rappel down into the canyon, then search the river valley on foot for a Parks Canada representative who would give them an avalanche beacon, with which to locate one of three caches containing their next clue.

Additional tasks
From Frame Lake, teams had to run to the ceremonial circle of Prince of Wales Northern Heritage Centre to find their first clue on top of their bags sending them to the Northwest Territories Legislative Assembly, where teams had to locate a wooden greeting containing a phrase written in Weledeh, a local Indigenous dialect: "hotìa dechı̨nta k’èahdè" ("travel safely across the land"). They then had to search the nearby forest, where hanging from the trees were tags containing words of the same language and their translation, for ones matching the clue. They then had to correctly recite the phrase in English to an Elder with expertise in Indigenous languages to receive their next clue, which also contained a BMO credit card that would serve as the teams' source of money for the rest of the season.
After the first task, teams had to drive a Chevrolet Silverado to Yellowknife Airport and book one of two flights to Edmonton, with the first four teams on the first flight. After landing at Edmonton International Airport, teams boarded a bus to the town of Jasper. At the Jasper Train Station, they would choose a Chevrolet Colorado "Z71" pickup that would serve as their transportation for the rest of the leg containing their next clue.
After getting the clue from the first Roadblock, teams had to paddle a raft along the Athabasca River to find the clue for the second Roadblock on the shoreline.

Leg 2 (Alberta)

Airdate: July 5, 2016
 Jasper (Jasper Park Information Centre) to Calgary (Downtown – City Hall)
Calgary (Downtown – The Bow (Wonderland ))
 Calgary (Downtown – Calgary Tower)
Calgary (McDougall Centre, Harley Hotchkiss Gardens or Century Gardens – Beatnik Bus)
 Calgary (South Airways Industrial Area – Canada Boy Vinyl)
 Calgary (Mayland Heights – Southern Alberta Institute of Technology or Inglewood – Bow Habitat Station (Sam Livingston Fish Hatchery))
Calgary (East Village – Studio Bell (National Music Centre)) 

In this leg's Roadblock, one team member had to rappel from the roof of the Calgary Tower to the street below to receive their next clue from Seefar, the Calgary Tower mascot.

This season's first Detour was a choice between Sim or Swim. In Sim, teams travelled to the Mayland Heights campus of the Southern Alberta Institute of Technology, where they had to use a training simulator to guide a crane's payload through a course on a simulated construction site without hitting any obstacles. If both team members successfully completed the course in a combined time of under six minutes, they received their next clue. In Swim, teams travelled to the Sam Livingston Fish Hatchery at the Bow Habitat Station, where they had to use a barrier to corral a school of rainbow troutlings into a confined area and then use nets to transfer the troutlings into two cages to receive their next clue.

Additional tasks
At the Jasper Park Information Centre, teams had to sign up for one of three buses, each carrying three teams, to Calgary. After they were dropped off at Calgary City Hall, teams were greeted by Mayor Naheed Nenshi, who gave them a photograph of a sculpture. They had to figure out that this was the Wonderland sculpture at The Bow building, where they would find their next clue.
After the Roadblock, teams had to track down the Beatnik Bus, a mobile record store, by using a locals' phone to check its social media accounts for hints of its location. The bus stopped for 10 minutes at a time at three locations around downtown: the McDougall Centre, the Harley Hotchkiss Gardens, and the Century Gardens. Once teams found it, they would receive their next clue from local musician SAVK after listening to a song performance.
In addition to the Detour clue, teams also had the option of going for two Express Passes. For this, they travelled to Canada Boy Vinyl, where they had to search for the Express Passes among 13 crates of newly pressed vinyl records, while placing each record they picked up into an album sleeve. Initially, Jillian & Emmett and Steph & Kristen agreed to both do the task and guarantee each other the second Express Pass. Jillian & Emmett changed their mind on the way to the store and decided to go to the next roadblock.

Leg 3 (Alberta → Vietnam)

Airdate: July 12, 2016
Calgary (Sunnyside – Peace Bridge) (Pit Start)
 Calgary (Calgary International Airport) to Ho Chi Minh City, Vietnam (Tan Son Nhat International Airport)
Cái Bè (Tourist Dock) (Overnight Rest)
 (Water taxi) Cái Bè (Tourist Dock to  )
 Tân Phong Island (Tân Phong Ferry Dock) to Cái Bè (Bến Phà Cái Bè Qua Tân Phong) 
Cái Bè (Cái Bè Land Market) 
 Cái Bè (Phước Ân Temple or Mekong Delta Canal)
 (Water taxi) Cái Bè (Mekong Lodge) 

In this leg's Roadblock, one team member had to use a stick with a small flag attached to separate and herd 20 ducks out of a flock of 300 into a pen to receive their next clue.

For their Speed Bump, Kelly & Kate had to carry a total of 20 toads by hand through the Cái Bè Land Market to a marked stall on the other side before they could continue racing.

This leg's Detour was a choice between Vibrate or Hydrate. In Vibrate, teams travelled to Phước Ân Temple, where they had to learn and correctly perform a traditional Vietnamese drum dance to receive their next clue. In Hydrate, teams had to load a sampan with 60 coconuts and row down a canal to a marked dock, where they had to unload and carry them to a nearby coconut water hut to receive their next clue.

Additional tasks
At the tourist dock in Cái Bè, teams had to sign up for a water taxi departing the next morning, when they would receive their next clue in the order they signed up.
After boarding a water taxi, teams were given a shopping list, written in Vietnamese, of four items they had to find within the floating market (a ceramic statue, fermented tofu, a basket of fruit and a  bag of rice) and then to deliver to Mr. Tam on Tân Phong Island near the ferry dock in exchange for their next clue.
From Tân Phong Island, teams had to take a ferry back to Cái Bè where they would find their next clue at the ferry terminal.
After completing the Roadblock, teams had to carry two ducks by hand to the Cái Bè Land Market and deliver them to a marked stall in exchange for the Detour clue.
After the Detour, teams had to take a water taxi to Mekong Lodge and search for the hotel's pool to find the Pit Stop.

Leg 4 (Vietnam)

Airdate: July 19, 2016
 Cái Bè (Mekong Lodge to Tourist Dock)
 Cái Bè (Cái Bè Bus Station) to Ho Chi Minh City (Western Region Bus Station)
Ho Chi Minh City (Chợ Lớn – Bà Thiên Hậu Temple)
Ho Chi Minh City (Corner of Lý Chính Thắng Street and Nguyễn Thông Street)
 Ho Chi Minh City (Sửa Chữa Bảo Dưỡng)
Ho Chi Minh City (District 1 – Quán Ốc A Sòi)
 Ho Chi Minh City (Glow Skybar or Kingdom Karaoke)
Ho Chi Minh City (City Hall) 

In the leg's Roadblock, one team member had to correctly assemble a scooter using only an instruction manual written in Vietnamese, and a sample scooter as a reference, to receive their next clue from the mechanic.

This leg's Detour was a choice between Flip Flop or V-Pop. In Flip Flop, teams travelled to Glow Skybar, where they would watch a demonstration of a flair bartending routine and the mixing of the bar's signature cocktail, the "Hello Vietnam". Teams then had to recreate the routine and the cocktail exactly to receive their next clue. In V-Pop, teams travelled to Kingdom Karaoke, where they had to correctly memorize at least one verse per team member of the V-pop song "Shine Your Light" then perform karaoke in front of an audience. If the song was performed correctly, a fan girl would give teams their next clue.

Additional tasks
At the start of the leg, teams had to take water taxis from the Pit Stop to the tourist dock and travel to the Cái Bè Bus Station, where they would find an intercity bus serving Route Number 3 which would bring them to Ho Chi Minh City. Once there, teams had to travel to Thiên Hậu Temple, where they had to pick two birdcages and release the birds from the cages to receive their next clue.
At Quán Ốc A Sòi, teams had to eat a dish of fried crickets, centipedes, worms, and a bat before receiving a box containing two live red palm weevil larvae (known locally as "coconut worms"). Each team member had to consume one coconut worm to receive their next clue.

Leg 5 (Vietnam → British Columbia)

Airdate: July 26, 2016
Ho Chi Minh City (September 23 Park) (Pit Start)
 Ho Chi Minh City (Tan Son Nhat International Airport) to Sandspit, Haida Gwaii, British Columbia, Canada (Sandspit Airport)
 Alliford Bay (Alliford Bay Ferry Terminal) to Skidegate, Graham Island (Skidegate Ferry Terminal)
Skidegate (Haida Heritage Centre) 
Skidegate (Spirit Lake Trail)
 (Seaplane) Queen Charlotte City (Queen Charlotte City Harbour) to Prince Rupert (Prince Rupert/Seal Cove Water Aerodrome)
Prince Rupert (City Hall – Charles Melville Hays Statue)
  Prince Rupert (Cow Bay Marina)
Port Edward (North Pacific Cannery National Historic Site) 

In this leg's first Roadblock, one team member had to listen to six Haida storytellers, who would each tell the story depicted on one of the totem poles outside of the Haida Heritage Centre, as well as the name of its carver: Ron Wilson, Tim Boyko, Jim Hart, Guujaaw, Garner Moody, and Norman Price. They then had to correctly identify all six totem poles by their carver to a judge on the nearby beach to receive their next clue.

In this leg's second Roadblock, teams travelled to Cow Bay Marina and took a water taxi, which departed every 20 minutes, to a log boom floating in the middle of the bay. Here, the team member who did not perform the previous Roadblock had to choose a lane and pilot a small tugboat equipped with a dozer blade to find three small timber rafts marked with red flags and push them to a dispatcher at the other end of the lane to receive their next clue.

Additional tasks
Upon arrival in Sandspit, teams had to choose a 2017 Chevrolet Volt that would serve as their transportation for the Haida Gwaii portion of the leg and then take a ferry across the harbour to Skidegate on Graham Island. They then had to drive to the Haida Heritage Centre, where they found the clue for the first Roadblock.
At the end of the Spirit Lake Trail, teams had to assemble two sets of puzzle pieces to form two works of contemporary Haida art and receive their next clue from the artist Ben Davidson.
At the Queen Charlotte City Harbour, teams had to board a seaplane to the coastal city of Prince Rupert, where they chose a 2016 Chevrolet Camaro that would serve as their transportation for the remainder of the leg. They then had to locate the statue of the city's founder, Charles Melville Hays, located in front of City Hall. Here, they found the clue for the second Roadblock.

Leg 6 (British Columbia → Ontario)

Airdate: August 2, 2016
Prince Rupert (Sunken Gardens Park) (Pit Start)
 Prince Rupert (Prince Rupert Airport) to Toronto, Ontario (Toronto Pearson International Airport)
Hamilton (Downtown – Bank of Montreal Hamilton Main Branch)
Hamilton (John C. Munro Hamilton International Airport – Canadian Warplane Heritage Museum) 
Hamilton (Bayfront Park)
 Hamilton (Heddle Marine Service or Collective Arts Brewing)
Hamilton (Dundurn Castle) 

Frankie & Amy used the Express Pass given to them by Steph & Kristen to bypass the Roadblock.

This leg's Detour was a choice between Dry Dock or Art Rock. In Dry Dock, teams travelled to Heddle Marine Service and entered the dry dock, where each team member had to suit up in protective gear and then properly weld an airtight seal on an  section of structural steel to receive their next clue. In Art Rock, teams travelled to Collective Arts Brewing, where they had to recreate a work of spray paint art using stencils to apply coloured layers in a specific order. If their work matched the example, teams could then take it to the brewery's stage to receive their next clue from the band Elliott BROOD.

Additional tasks
After arriving in Toronto, teams had to travel to Downtown Hamilton and find the Bank of Montreal main branch. Here, each team received a video message on a tablet computer from their loved ones who would inform them of the location of their next clue: the Canadian Warplane Heritage Museum.
At Bayfront Park, teams had to participate in a three-part challenge from MEC. They had to ride bicycles along a trail to a marked boat launch, where they then had to paddle kayaks across Hamilton Harbour to an outdoor climbing wall that each team member had to climb and ring a bell at the top to receive their next clue.

Leg 7 (Ontario)

Airdates: August 2 & 9, 2016
 Burlington (Aldershot GO Station) to Toronto (Union Station)
 Toronto (Union Station) to Kingston (Kingston Railway Station)
Kingston (Springer Market Square)
Kingston (Clarence Street)
 Kingston (Queen's University – Nixon Field or Kingston Yacht Club)
Kingston (Kingston Penitentiary) 
Kingston (Bellevue House) 
Kingston (Rideau Canal – Kingston Mills Lock Station) 

This leg's Detour was a choice between On the Field or Offshore. In On the Field, teams travelled to Nixon Field at Queen's University, where they had to wear Bumperz and complete a series of bubble soccer drills against Queen's University women's soccer players. They had to perform a somersault, pass a soccer ball back and forth between each other, and finally score a goal while the goalie attempted to ram the scoring team member in under 25 seconds before receiving their next clue from the university's mascot Boo Hoo the Bear. In Offshore, teams travelled to the Kingston Yacht Club, where they had to properly rig a sailboat, following a completed example, and then sail it out to a buoy to retrieve their clue and before returning to the dock.

In this leg's Roadblock, one team member had to dress as the first Prime Minister of Canada, Sir John A. Macdonald, then memorize and correctly recite one of Macdonald's political speeches, which included prompts to ring a bell, to an audience of historical players to receive their next clue.

Additional tasks
After arriving in Kingston, teams had to travel to Springer Market Square in front of City Hall, which opened at 9:30 a.m. the next morning. At that time, they had to search the market for the Vader's Maple Syrup stand, where they found their next clue.
On Clarence Street, teams would find several 2016 Chevrolet Cruzes, each with a four-digit licence plate, and six locked cases with a tablet computer inside. Once teams found a licence plate number that opened a case, they could use the myChevrolet app on the tablet to unlock the vehicle, which would serve as their transportation for the rest of the leg, and retrieve their next clue.
The clue after the Detour instructed teams to head to Kingston Penitentiary, where they encountered the Double U-Turn board. They then had to enter the penitentiary and search among 400 cells for their next clue.

Leg 8 (Ontario → Cuba)

Airdate: August 23, 2016
Kingston (Kingston City Hall) (Pit Start)
 Kingston (Kingston Railway Station) to Toronto (Union Station)
 Toronto (Union Station) to Mississauga (Toronto Pearson Terminal 1 Station)
 Toronto (Toronto Pearson International Airport) to Havana, Cuba (José Martí International Airport)
Havana (Castillo de la Real Fuerza)
 Havana (Old Havana – Havana Club Rum Museum and Park Humboldt or Park Humboldt)
Havana (Old Havana – Cámara Oscura)
Havana (Old Havana – Hotel Ambos Mundos)
 Havana (Habana del Este – Playas del Este (Mi Cayito))
Havana (Pedrito's Max Brakes) 
Havana (El Morro – Restaurante La Divina Pastora) 

This leg's Detour was a choice between Sugar or Shake. In Sugar, teams made their way to the Havana Club Rum Museum and, using a manual grinder, had to extract  of sugar juice from sugar cane. Then, each team member had to deliver two trays of drinks on foot to Park Humboldt and then make their way back to the museum to get their next clue. In Shake, teams went directly to Park Humboldt, where they had to learn and correctly perform a Casino Salsa routine to receive their next clue.

For this season's first Face Off, teams had to compete against each other in a game of beach volleyball. The first team to score 15 points would receive their next clue, while their opponents had to wait for another team. The last losing team had to wait for the sand to run out of an hourglass before receiving their clue.

In this leg's Roadblock, one team member had to watch a demonstration and then correctly make three engine gaskets from old tire rubber to receive their next clue.

Additional tasks
At Castillo de la Real Fuerza, teams had to search the grounds for a scale model replica of the Canadian schooner Bluenose to find their next clue.
At the Cámara Oscura, teams had to listen to a guided tour and spot an Amazing Race flag hanging off Hotel Ambos Mundos. The tour guide would tell them that the hotel is the site of the Ernest Hemingway museum in Room 511, where they would find their next clue.

Leg 9 (Cuba → Nova Scotia)

Airdate: August 30, 2016
Havana (Hotel Meliá Habana) (Pit Start)
 Havana (José Martí International Airport) to Sydney, Cape Breton Island, Nova Scotia, Canada (JA Douglas McCurdy Sydney Airport)
Sydney (Canadian Coast Guard College)
 Christmas Island (Christmas Island Post Office)
 Iona (Highland Village Museum)
Iona (Highland Village Museum – Blackhouse) 
Louisbourg (Fortress of Louisbourg)
Louisbourg (Louisbourg Lighthouse) 

For their Speed Bump, Rita & Yvette had to deliver two sacks of letters from cadets of the Canadian Coast Guard College to the Christmas Island post office and then stamp every letter with the office's famous postmark before they could continue racing.

This leg's Detour, at the Highland Village Museum, was a choice between Feel the Rhythm or Feel the Burn, both requiring teams to dress in traditional attire. In Feel the Rhythm, teams had to learn and correctly perform a traditional Scottish highland dance routine with a troupe to receive their next clue. In Feel the Burn, teams completed a series of three Highland Games events. First, each team member had to toss a caber so it lands end-over-end within designated lines. Then, they each had to carry or move either two heavy logs (larger logs for men) for two laps around a marked course, or one for four laps if they choose, in the "Farmer's Walk". Finally, each team member had to throw a stone so it lands on one of two targets to receive their next clue.

Additional tasks
Once in Sydney, teams chose a 2016 Chevrolet Malibu, which would serve as their transportation for the leg. Teams were also informed that their mileage would be measured using the Teen Driver System feature, and the team who drove the least total distance in this leg would win a bonus $5,000 prize at the Pit Stop.
At the Canadian Coast Guard College, teams chose a vessel and took part in a Coast Guard rescue drill. They had to direct their driver to one of two marked locations using only nautical terminology. There, one team member then had to swim out to retrieve a dummy representing a victim. After returning to shore, they then had to bring the dummy to a waiting ambulance. If teams brought back the correct dummy, they received the clue for the Detour.
After either Detour, teams travelled on foot to the Highland Village Museum's blackhouse, where they encountered the Double U-Turn Board.
At the Fortress of Louisbourg, teams had to dress in a period French military uniform and roll six heavy wooden barrels filled with simulated gunpowder through the grounds to the top of the fortress. After completing this, teams fired a cannon on the battlement before receiving their next clue.

Leg 10 (Nova Scotia → New Brunswick)

Airdate: September 6, 2016
 Sydney (Merchant Mariner Monument) to Saint John, New Brunswick (Bank of Montreal)
Saint John (Saint John City Market)
 Saint John (Moosehead Breweries or Crosby's Molasses)
 Saint Andrews (Algonquin Resort Golf Course – 12th Hole)
Saint Andrews (Kingsbrae Garden – Scents and Sensitivity Garden) 
Saint Andrews (Passamaquoddy Bay – Indian Point) 

This season's final Detour was a choice between 1867 or 1879. In 1867, teams travelled to Moosehead Breweries, where they had to choose one of five uniquely labeled beer bottles and pull enough matching bottles from a fast-moving production line to fill five 24-beer cases. They then had to stack a full pallet of cases to receive their next clue. In 1879, teams travelled to Crosby's Molasses, where they had to follow a recipe to prepare the company's signature molasses taffy. After the mixture was heated, teams then had to pull the mixture until they made at least  of taffy with the correct texture and color to receive their next clue.

For this season's second Face Off, teams drove themselves to the Algonquin Resort Golf Course in the town of Saint Andrews. At the 12th hole, teams competed in a round of golf. One team would take alternating strokes to sink their ball in the hole, then wait for their opponent to do the same. If a team lost their ball, there would be a one-stroke penalty. The team who took fewer strokes received their next clue, while their opponents had to wait for another team. The last losing team had to wait for the sand to run out of an hourglass before receiving their clue.

In this leg's Roadblock, teams entered the Scents and Sensitivity Garden within the Kingsbrae Garden, where the participating team member would be blindfolded for the duration of the task. They would first be led to one side of the garden by their partner, who would read them the English names of 15 plants they had to memorize, each distinguishable by a unique scent or texture. They then had to follow a guide rope on their own to the other side of the garden and correctly identify all 15 plants by touch and smell to receive their next clue. If any were incorrect, they would be led back to their partner to try again.

Additional tasks
Teams signed up for one of two buses, each carrying two teams, from Sydney to Saint John, New Brunswick. Once there, they had to search downtown for a 2016 Chevrolet Spark, which would serve as their transportation for this leg and contained their next clue.
At Saint John City Market, teams would find a Hotels.com kiosk and were given five gift baskets to deliver, each to a different hotel. To find the locations, they had use a provided tablet to enter the search criteria listed on the delivery tag of each gift basket into the filter on the Hotels.com app. Once all five were delivered, teams could return to the kiosk to receive the clue for the Detour.
After the Roadblock, teams had to use the hands-free OnStar feature in their Spark to call Jon Montgomery, who told them to search for the Pit Stop at Indian Point on the shore of Passamaquoddy Bay.

Leg 11 (New Brunswick → Quebec)

Airdate: September 13, 2016
Saint John (Hilton Saint John) (Pit Start)
 Saint John (Saint John Airport) to Montreal, Quebec (Montréal–Pierre Elliott Trudeau International Airport)
Montreal (Saint-Michel – Cirque du Soleil World Headquarters)
Montreal (Old Montreal – Bank of Montreal Head Office)
 Montreal (Saint Helen's Island – Montreal Biosphere)
Montreal (St-Viateur Bagel) 
Montreal (Moment Factory)
Montreal (Mont-Royal – Kondiaronk Belvedere) 

In this leg's first Roadblock, teams travelled to the Montreal Biosphere on Saint Helen's Island. Inside the sphere, one team member had to use a mechanical ascender to climb  to the observation deck of the museum, pull themselves horizontally across a suspended line to a platform on the outer structure, and finally, rappel down to retrieve their next clue on the exterior of the sphere.

In this season's final Roadblock, the team member who did not perform the previous Roadblock had to stack three orders of Montreal-style bagels on holder sticks in a specific top-to-bottom sequence by variety, three sticks per order. They then had to deliver them on foot, carrying a complete order each time, to three locations in the surrounding neighbourhood of Mile End. If the bagels were not arranged correctly, they would not be accepted. Once all deliveries were successfully completed, racers could return to St-Viateur Bagel to receive their next clue.

Additional tasks
At the Cirque du Soleil World Headquarters, teams had to dress in performer costume and complete a series of three Cirque de Soleil tricks, with each racer required to perform at least one. First, one team member was harnessed with bungee cords and had to bounce to gain enough momentum to reach a trapeze. Next, one team member had to stand on and roll a large ball across the room without falling. Finally, one team member had to scale a Chinese pole to grab their next clue.
At the Bank of Montreal's original head office, teams had to use a codebook to decipher an encoded message relating to BMO's history and then read it to a bank teller. If it was correct, teams received a key, with which they could then enter the vault and unlock a safe deposit box containing their next clue.
At the Moment Factory, teams would find a flatscreen displaying a map of Canada, Vietnam and Cuba with the visited cities highlighted and had to place plaques each containing a phrase heard or read from various sources throughout the season, 1 per leg, in the corresponding space on the interactive surface. 22 misleading phrases were also included. The correct answers were:
{| class="wikitable"
|-
!Leg
!Location
!Phrase
!Source
|-
!1
|Yellowknife, NT
|Travel Safely Across the Land
|Translated Phrase at First Task
|-
!2
|Calgary, AB
|Be Part of the Energy
|Mayor Nenshi
|-
!3
|Cái Bè, Vietnam
|Vibrate or Hydrate
|Detour Clue
|-
!4
|Ho Chi Minh City, Vietnam
|Make a Wish
|Birdcages Route Marker Clue
|-
!5
|Prince Rupert, BC
|City of Rainbows
|Pit Stop Greeter
|-
!6
|Hamilton, ON
|Backseat Driver
|Roadblock Clue
|-
!7
|Kingston, ON
|My Beloved Country
|Last Line of Roadblock Speech
|-
!8
|Havana, Cuba
|Bluenose Achieved Immortality
|Plaque at Bluenose Replica
|-
!9
|Sydney, NS
|Blackhouse
|Clue after Detour
|-
!10
|Saint Andrews, NB
|Who's Teed Off
|Face Off Clue
|-
!11
|Montreal, QC
|Who's On the Bubble
|Roadblock Clue
|}
Once teams correctly filled all 11 spaces, they received their final clue.

Episode title quotes
Episode titles are often taken from quotes made by the racers.
"Who's Ready to Let It All Hang Out?" – Non-Racer 
"Deal, Guys? Deal! Deal!" – Jillian
"Toads! Are You Kidding Me?" – Kate
"Shine Your Light" – Non-Racer 
"The Little Blind Tugboat That Could" – Julie
"Am I Actually Operating the Plane?" – Steph
"I Could Be Prime Minister" – Kristen
"I Just Wanna Win" – Steph
"For Those About to Rock" – Joel
"We're Doing It Wrong! We're In Big Trouble" – Jillian
"Second Place Isn't Good Enough" – Ashley

Ratings
Viewership includes initial date of viewing plus seven-day DVR playback.

Episode 6, "Am I Actually Operating the Plane?", aired during the opening week of the 2016 Summer Olympics.
Episode 7, "I Could Be Prime Minister", aired during the first full week of the 2016 Summer Olympics.

Notes

References

External links

 04
2016 Canadian television seasons
Television shows filmed in the Northwest Territories
Television shows filmed in Alberta
Television shows filmed in Vietnam
Television shows filmed in British Columbia
Television shows filmed in Ontario
Television shows filmed in Cuba
Television shows filmed in Nova Scotia
Television shows filmed in New Brunswick
Television shows filmed in Montreal